Annie Smyth (1878–1942) was a notable New Zealand Salvation Army officer and missionary to Japan. She was born in Kaiwharawhara, Wellington, New Zealand in 1878. She was murdered in Wairoa, along with her sister Rosamond, by Leo Hannan, a self-confessed serial killer.

References

1878 births
1942 deaths
New Zealand Salvationists
New Zealand Methodist missionaries
People from Wellington City
Methodist missionaries in Japan
New Zealand expatriates in Japan
Victims of serial killers
People murdered in New Zealand
New Zealand murder victims
Female murder victims